Blijnii Hutor is a village in the Slobozia District of Transnistria, Moldova. It is currently under the administration of the breakaway government of the Transnistrian Moldovan Republic.

References

Villages of Transnistria
Slobozia District